The Misa Bridge crosses the Han River in South Korea and connects the cities of Hanam and Namyangju. It is part of the Seoul-Chuncheon Expressway.

References

Buildings and structures in Hanam
Buildings and structures in Namyangju
Bridges in Gyeonggi Province
Bridges completed in 2009